Nemadji is an unincorporated community in Barnum Township, Carlton County, Minnesota, United States.

Carlton County Roads 8 and 11 are two of the main routes in the community.

Nemadji is located six miles east-southeast of Barnum and nine miles east-northeast of Moose Lake.

History
A post office was established at Nemadji in 1912, and remained in operation until it was discontinued in 1953. The community took its name from the Nemadji River.

References

Further reading
 Official State of Minnesota Highway Map – 2011/2012 edition
 Mn/DOT map of Carlton County – 2012 edition

Unincorporated communities in Carlton County, Minnesota
Unincorporated communities in Minnesota